Carlene Clancy Smith is a retired judge from Oklahoma. Her last position was as a justice of the Oklahoma Court of Criminal Appeals (OCCA). She was appointed on September 13, 2010 by Oklahoma Supreme Court Chief Justice James E. Edmondson to replace the recently-retired Justice Charles Chapel. She retired on June 17, 2017. She served as the presiding judge of the court for a two-year term starting on January 1, 2015.

Early life and education 
Clancy Smith was born and raised in Hugo, Oklahoma, where she graduated from Hugo High School in 1960. She then attended Oklahoma State University, where she earned a Bachelor's degree in English, graduating in 1964. After graduating, she taught English at Memorial High School in Tulsa, and in Jacksonville, Florida. Later, she enrolled at the University of Tulsa College of Law, where she earned the Juris Doctor degree in 1980, then entered a private law practice for fourteen years.

Career 
She became a special district judge in the Family Law Division of the Tulsa County District Court from 1994 until 1998. She received the Outstanding Family Law Judge Award from the Family Law Section of the Oklahoma Bar Association (OBA) in 1996. Governor Brad Henry appointed her as district judge for the Fourteenth Judicial District in 2005. She served until 2010 in the Criminal Division of the District Court of Tulsa County and presided over more than 110 felony jury trials.

While serving as District Judge, Smith worked closely with Women In Recovery for alternative sentencing options for women.

On October 17, 2017, Governor Fallin announced that Judge Dana Kuehn would succeed Judge Smith on the OCCA.

Honors and memberships
 Member, Tulsa Bar Association
 Member, Oklahoma Bar Association
 President of the Johnson-Sontag Chapter of the America Inns of Court for three years
 Received the James Sontag Award for ethics and civility in 2010
 Recipient of the 2010 Mona Salyer Lambird Spotlight Award.

Personal
Smith is married to Jim Thompson. The couple has two children and four grandchildren.

Notes

References 

Year of birth missing (living people)
Living people
20th-century American judges
21st-century American judges
People from Hugo, Oklahoma
Oklahoma State University alumni
Oklahoma state court judges
20th-century American women judges
21st-century American women judges